Several species of humans have intermittently occupied Great Britain for almost a million years.  The earliest evidence of human occupation around 900,000 years ago is at Happisburgh on the Norfolk coast, with stone tools and footprints probably made by Homo antecessor. The oldest human fossils, around 500,000 years old, are of Homo heidelbergensis at Boxgrove in Sussex. Until this time Britain had been permanently connected to the Continent by a chalk ridge between South East England and northern France called the Weald-Artois Anticline, but during the Anglian Glaciation around 425,000 years ago a megaflood broke through the ridge, and Britain became an island when sea levels rose during the following Hoxnian interglacial.

Fossils of very early Neanderthals dating to around 400,000 years ago have been found at Swanscombe in Kent, and of classic Neanderthals about 225,000 years old at Pontnewydd in Wales. Britain was unoccupied by humans between 180,000 and 60,000 years ago, when Neanderthals returned. By 40,000 years ago they had become extinct and modern humans had reached Britain. But even their occupations were brief and intermittent due to a climate which swung between low temperatures with a tundra habitat and severe ice ages which made Britain uninhabitable for long periods. The last of these, the Younger Dryas, ended around 11,700 years ago, and since then Britain has been continuously occupied.

Traditionally it was claimed by academics that a post-glacial land bridge existed between Britain and Ireland, however this conjecture began to be refuted by a consensus within the academic community starting in 1983, and since 2006 the idea of a land bridge has been disproven based upon conclusive marine geological evidence. It is now concluded that an ice bridge existed between Britain and Ireland up until 16,000 years ago, but this had melted by around 14,000 years ago. Britain was at this time still joined to the Continent by a land bridge known as Doggerland, but due to rising sea levels this causeway of dry land would have become a series of estuaries, inlets and islands by 7000 BC, and by 6200 BC, it would have become completely submerged.

Located at the fringes of Europe, Britain received European technological and cultural developments much later than Southern Europe and the Mediterranean region did during prehistory. By around 4000 BC, the island was populated by people with a Neolithic culture. This neolithic population had significant ancestry from the earliest farming communities in Anatolia, indicating that a major migration accompanied farming. The beginning of the Bronze Age and the Bell Beaker culture was marked by an even greater population turnover, this time displacing more than 90% of Britain's neolithic ancestry in the process. This is documented by recent ancient DNA studies which demonstrate that the immigrants had large amounts of Bronze-Age Eurasian Steppe ancestry, associated with the spread of Indo-European languages and the Yamnaya culture.

No written language of the pre-Roman inhabitants of Britain is known; therefore, the history, culture and way of life of pre-Roman Britain are known mainly through archaeological finds. Archaeological evidence demonstrates that ancient Britons were involved in extensive maritime trade and cultural links with the rest of Europe from the Neolithic onwards, especially by exporting tin that was in abundant supply.  Although the main evidence for the period is archaeological, available genetic evidence is increasing, and views of British prehistory are evolving accordingly. Julius Caesar's first invasion of Britain in 55 BC is regarded as the start of recorded protohistory although some historical information is available from before then.

Stone Age

Palaeolithic

Palaeolithic (Old Stone Age) Britain is the period of the earliest known occupation of Britain by humans. This huge period saw many changes in the environment, encompassing several glacial and interglacial episodes greatly affecting human settlement in the region. Providing dating for this distant period is difficult and contentious. The inhabitants of the region at this time were bands of hunter-gatherers who roamed Northern Europe following herds of animals, or who supported themselves by fishing.

There is evidence from bones and flint tools found in coastal deposits near Happisburgh in Norfolk and Pakefield in Suffolk that a species of Homo was present in what is now Britain at least 814,000 years ago. At this time, Southern and Eastern Britain were linked to continental Europe by a wide land bridge (Doggerland) allowing humans to move freely. The species itself lived before the ancestors of Neanderthals split from the ancestors of Homo sapiens 600,000 years ago. The current position of the English Channel was a large river flowing westwards and fed by tributaries that later became the Thames and Seine. Reconstructing this ancient environment has provided clues to the route first visitors took to arrive at what was then a peninsula of the Eurasian continent. Archaeologists have found a string of early sites located close to the route of a now lost watercourse named the Bytham River which indicate that it was exploited as the earliest route west into Britain.

Sites such as Boxgrove in Sussex illustrate the later arrival in the archaeological record of an archaic Homo species called Homo heidelbergensis around 500,000 years ago. These early peoples made Acheulean flint tools (hand axes) and hunted the large native mammals of the period. One hypothesis is that they drove elephants, rhinoceroses and hippopotamuses over the tops of cliffs or into bogs to more easily kill them.

The extreme cold of the following Anglian Stage is likely to have driven humans out of Britain altogether and the region does not appear to have been occupied again until the ice receded during the Hoxnian Stage. This warmer time period lasted from around 424,000 until 374,000 years ago and saw the Clactonian flint tool industry develop at sites such as Swanscombe in Kent. The period has produced a rich and widespread distribution of sites by Palaeolithic standards, although uncertainty over the relationship between the Clactonian and Acheulean industries is still unresolved.

Britain was populated only intermittently, and even during periods of occupation may have reproduced below replacement level and needed immigration from elsewhere to maintain numbers. According to Paul Pettitt and Mark White:
The British Lower Palaeolithic (and equally that of much of northern Europe) is thus a long record of abandonment and colonisation, and a very short record of residency. The sad but inevitable conclusion of this must be that Britain has little role to play in any understanding of long-term human evolution and its cultural history is largely a broken record dependent on external introductions and insular developments that ultimately lead nowhere. Britain, therefore, was an island of the living dead.

This period also saw Levallois flint tools introduced, possibly by humans arriving from Africa. However, finds from Swanscombe and Botany Pit in Purfleet support Levallois technology being a European rather than African introduction. The more advanced flint technology permitted more efficient hunting and therefore made Britain a more worthwhile place to remain until the following period of cooling known as the Wolstonian Stage, 352,000–130,000 years ago. Britain first became an island about 350,000 years ago. Early Neanderthal remains discovered at the Pontnewydd Cave in Wales have been dated to 230,000 BP, and are the most north westerly Neanderthal remains found anywhere in the world.

From c.180,000 to c.60,000 years ago there is no evidence of human occupation in Britain, probably due to inhospitable cold in some periods, Britain being cut off as an island in others, and the neighbouring areas of north-west Europe being unoccupied by hominins at times when Britain was both accessible and hospitable.

This period is often divided into three subperiods: the Early Upper Palaeolithic (before the main glacial period), the Middle-Upper Palaeolithic (the main glacial period) and the Late Upper Palaeolithic (after the main glacial period). There was limited Neanderthal occupation of Britain in marine isotope stage 3 between about 60,000 and 42,000 years BP. Britain had its own unique variety of late Neanderthal handaxe, the bout-coupé, so seasonal migration between Britain and the continent is unlikely, but the main occupation may have been in the now submerged area of Doggerland, with summer migrations to Britain in warmer periods. La Cotte de St Brelade in Jersey is the only site in the British Isles to have produced late Neanderthal fossils.

The earliest evidence for modern humans in North West Europe is a jawbone discovered in England at Kents Cavern in 1927, which was re-dated in 2011 to between 41,000 and 44,000 years old. The most famous example from this period is the burial of the "Red Lady of Paviland" (actually now known to be a man) in modern-day coastal South Wales, which was dated in 2009 to be 33,000 years old. The distribution of finds shows that humans in this period preferred the uplands of Wales and northern and western England to the flatter areas of eastern England. Their stone tools are similar to those of the same age found in Belgium and far north-east France, and very different from those in north-west France. At a time when Britain was not an island, hunter gatherers may have followed migrating herds of reindeer from Belgium and north-east France across the giant Channel River.

The climatic deterioration which culminated in the Last Glacial Maximum, between about 26,500 and 19,000–20,000 years ago, drove humans out of Britain, and there is no evidence of occupation for around 18,000 years after c.33,000 years BP. Sites such as Cathole Cave in Swansea County dated at 14,500BP, Creswell Crags on the border between Derbyshire and Nottinghamshire at 12,800BP and Gough's Cave in Somerset 12,000 years BP, provide evidence suggesting that humans returned to Britain towards the end of this ice age during a warm period from 14,700 to 12,900 years ago (the Bølling-Allerød interstadial known as the Windermere Interstadial in Britain), although further extremes of cold right before the final thaw may have caused them to leave again and then return repeatedly. The environment during this ice age period would have been largely treeless tundra, eventually replaced by a gradually warmer climate, perhaps reaching 17 degrees Celsius (62.6 Fahrenheit) in summer, encouraging the expansion of birch trees as well as shrub and grasses.

The first distinct culture of the Upper Palaeolithic in Britain is what archaeologists call the Creswellian industry, with leaf-shaped points probably used as arrowheads. It produced more refined flint tools but also made use of bone, antler, shell, amber, animal teeth, and mammoth ivory. These were fashioned into tools but also jewellery and rods of uncertain purpose. Flint seems to have been brought into areas with limited local resources; the stone tools found in the caves of Devon, such as Kent's Cavern, seem to have been sourced from Salisbury Plain, 100 miles (161 km) east. This is interpreted as meaning that the early inhabitants of Britain were highly mobile, roaming over wide distances and carrying 'toolkits' of flint blades with them rather than heavy, unworked flint nodules, or else improvising tools extemporaneously. The possibility that groups also travelled to meet and exchange goods or sent out dedicated expeditions to source flint has also been suggested.

The dominant food species were equines (Equus ferus) and red deer (Cervus elaphus), although other mammals ranging from hares to mammoth were also hunted, including rhino and hyena. From the limited evidence available, burial seemed to involve skinning and dismembering a corpse with the bones placed in caves. This suggests a practice of excarnation and secondary burial, and possibly some form of ritual cannibalism. Artistic expression seems to have been mostly limited to engraved bone, although the cave art at Creswell Crags and Mendip caves are notable exceptions.

Between about 12,890 and 11,650 years ago Britain returned to glacial conditions during the Younger Dryas, and may have been unoccupied for periods.

Mesolithic

(c. 9,000 to 4,300 BC)

The Younger Dryas was followed by the Holocene, which began around 9,700 BC, and continues to the present. There was then limited occupation by Ahrensburgian hunter gatherers, but this came to an end when there was a final downturn in temperature which lasted from around 9,400 to 9,200 BC. Mesolithic people occupied Britain by around 9,000 BC, and it has been occupied ever since. By 8000 BC temperatures were higher than today, and birch woodlands spread rapidly, but there was a cold spell around 6,200 BC which lasted about 150 years. The plains of Doggerland were thought to have finally been submerged around 6500 to 6000 BC, but recent evidence suggests that the bridge may have lasted until between 5800 and 5400 BC, and possibly as late as 3800 BC.

The warmer climate changed the arctic environment to one of pine, birch and alder forest; this less open landscape was less conducive to the large herds of reindeer and wild horse that had previously sustained humans. Those animals were replaced in people's diets by pig and less social animals such as elk, red deer, roe deer, wild boar and aurochs (wild cattle), which would have required different hunting techniques. Tools changed to incorporate barbs which could snag the flesh of an animal, making it harder for it to escape alive. Tiny microliths were developed for hafting onto harpoons and spears. Woodworking tools such as adzes appear in the archaeological record, although some flint blade types remained similar to their Palaeolithic predecessors. The dog was domesticated because of its benefits during hunting, and the wetland environments created by the warmer weather would have been a rich source of fish and game. Wheat of a variety grown in the Middle East was present on the Isle of Wight at the Bouldnor Cliff Mesolithic Village dating from about 6,000 BC.

It is likely that these environmental changes were accompanied by social changes. Humans spread and reached the far north of Scotland during this period. Sites from the British Mesolithic include the Mendips, Star Carr in Yorkshire and Oronsay in the Inner Hebrides. Excavations at Howick in Northumberland uncovered evidence of a large circular building dating to c. 7600 BC which is interpreted as a dwelling. A further example has also been identified at Deepcar in Sheffield, and a building dating to c. 8500 BC was discovered at the Star Carr site.  The older view of Mesolithic Britons as nomadic is now being replaced with a more complex picture of seasonal occupation or, in some cases, permanent occupation. Travel distances seem to have become shorter, typically with movement between high and low ground.

In 1997, DNA analysis was carried out on a tooth of Cheddar Man, human remains dated to c.  7150 BC found in Gough's Cave at Cheddar Gorge.  His mitochondrial DNA (mtDNA) belonged to Haplogroup U5. Within modern European populations, U5 is now concentrated in North-East Europe, among members of the Sami people, Finns, and Estonians. This distribution and the age of the haplogroup indicate that individuals belonging to U5 were among the first people to resettle Northern Europe, following the retreat of ice sheets from the Last Glacial Maximum, about 10,000 years ago. It has also been found in other Mesolithic remains in Germany, Lithuania, Poland, Portugal, Russia, Sweden, France and Spain. Members of U5 may have been one of the most common haplogroups in Europe, before the spread of agriculture from the Middle East.

Though the Mesolithic environment was bounteous, the rising population and the ancient Britons' success in exploiting it eventually led to local exhaustion of many natural resources. The remains of a Mesolithic elk found caught in a bog at Poulton-le-Fylde in Lancashire show that it had been wounded by hunters and escaped on three occasions, indicating hunting during the Mesolithic.  A few Neolithic monuments overlie Mesolithic sites but little continuity can be demonstrated.
Farming of crops and domestic animals was adopted in Britain around 4500 BC, at least partly because of the need for reliable food sources.
The climate had been warming since the later Mesolithic and continued to improve, replacing the earlier pine forests with woodland.

Neolithic

(c. 4,300 to 2,000 BC)

The Neolithic was the period of domestication of plants and animals, but the arrival of a Neolithic package of farming and a sedentary lifestyle is increasingly giving way to a more complex view of the changes and continuities in practices that can be observed from the Mesolithic period onwards. For example, the development of Neolithic monumental architecture, apparently venerating the dead, may represent more comprehensive social and ideological changes involving new interpretations of time, ancestry, community and identity.

In any case, the Neolithic Revolution, as it is called, introduced a more settled way of life and ultimately led to societies becoming divided into differing groups of farmers, artisans and leaders. Forest clearances were undertaken to provide room for cereal cultivation and animal herds. Native cattle and pigs were reared whilst sheep and goats were later introduced from the continent, as were the wheats and barleys grown in Britain. However, only a few actual settlement sites are known in Britain, unlike the continent. Cave occupation was common at this time.

The construction of the earliest earthwork sites in Britain began during the early Neolithic (c. 4400 BC – 3300 BC) in the form of long barrows used for communal burial and the first causewayed enclosures, sites which have parallels on the continent.  The former may be derived from the long house, although no long house villages have been found in Britain — only individual examples. The stone-built houses on Orkney — such as those at Skara Brae — are, however, indicators of some nucleated settlement in Britain. Evidence of growing mastery over the environment is embodied in the Sweet Track, a wooden trackway built to cross the marshes of the Somerset Levels and dated to 3807 BC. Leaf-shaped arrowheads, round-based pottery types and the beginnings of polished axe production are common indicators of the period. Evidence of the use of cow's milk comes from analysis of pottery contents found beside the Sweet Track. According to archaeological evidence from North Yorkshire, salt was being produced by evaporation of seawater around this time, enabling more effective preservation of meat.

Pollen analysis shows that woodland was decreasing and grassland increasing, with a major decline of elms. The winters were typically 3 degrees colder than at present but the summers some 2.5 degrees warmer.

The Middle Neolithic (c. 3300 BC – c. 2900 BC) saw the development of cursus monuments close to earlier barrows and the growth and abandonment of causewayed enclosures, as well as the building of impressive chamber tombs such as the Maeshowe types. The earliest stone circles and individual burials also appear.

Different pottery types, such as grooved ware, appear during the later Neolithic (c. 2900 BC – c. 2200 BC). In addition, new enclosures called henges were built, along with stone rows and the famous sites of Stonehenge, Avebury and Silbury Hill, which building reached its peak at this time. Industrial flint mining begins, such as that at Cissbury and Grimes Graves, along with evidence of long-distance trade. Wooden tools and bowls were common, and bows were also constructed.

Changes in Neolithic culture could have been due to the mass migrations that occurred in that time. A 2017 study showed that British Neolithic farmers had formerly been genetically similar to contemporary populations in the Iberian peninsula, but from the Beaker culture period onwards, all British individuals had high proportions of Steppe ancestry and were genetically more similar to Beaker-associated people from the Lower Rhine area. The study argues that more than 90% of Britain's Neolithic gene pool was replaced with the coming of the Beaker people.

Analysis of the mitochondrial DNA of modern European populations shows that over 80% are descended in the female line from European hunter-gatherers. Less than 20% are descended in the female line from Neolithic farmers from Anatolia and from subsequent migrations. The percentage in Britain is smaller at around 11%. Initial studies suggested that this situation is different with the paternal Y-chromosome DNA, varying from 10 to 100% across the country, being higher in the east. This was considered to show a large degree of population replacement during the Anglo-Saxon invasion and a nearly complete masking over of whatever population movement (or lack of it) went before in these two countries. However, more widespread studies have suggested that there was less of a division between Western and Eastern parts of Britain with less Anglo-Saxon migration. Looking from a more Europe-wide standpoint, researchers at Stanford University have found overlapping cultural and genetic evidence that supports the theory that migration was at least partially responsible for the Neolithic Revolution in Northern Europe (including Britain). The science of genetic anthropology is changing very fast and a clear picture across the whole of human occupation of Britain has yet to emerge.

Bronze Age

(Around 2200 to 750 BC)

This period can be sub-divided into an earlier phase (2300 to 1200 BC) and a later one (1200 – 700 BC). Beaker pottery appears in England around 2475–2315 cal. BC along with flat axes and burial practices of inhumation. With the revised Stonehenge chronology, this is after the Sarsen Circle and trilithons were erected at Stonehenge. Several regions of origin have been postulated for the Beaker culture, notably the Iberian peninsula, the Netherlands and Central Europe. Beaker techniques brought to Britain the skill of refining metal. At first the users made items from copper, but from around 2150 BCE smiths had discovered how to smelt bronze (which is much harder than copper) by mixing copper with a small amount of tin. With this discovery, the Bronze Age arrived in Britain. Over the next thousand years, bronze gradually replaced stone as the main material for tool and weapon making.

Britain had large, easily accessible reserves of tin in the modern areas of Cornwall and Devon and thus tin mining began. By around 1600 BC the southwest of Britain was experiencing a trade boom as British tin was exported across Europe, evidence of ports being found in Southern Devon at Bantham and Mount Batten. Copper was mined at the Great Orme in North Wales.

The Beaker people were also skilled at making ornaments from gold, silver and copper, and examples of these have been found in graves of the wealthy Wessex culture of central southern Britain.

Early Bronze Age Britons buried their dead beneath earth mounds known as barrows, often with a beaker alongside the body. Later in the period, cremation was adopted as a burial practice with cemeteries of urns containing cremated individuals appearing in the archaeological record, with deposition of metal objects such as daggers. People of this period were also largely responsible for building many famous prehistoric sites such as the later phases of Stonehenge along with Seahenge. The Bronze Age people lived in round houses and divided up the landscape. Stone rows are to be seen on, for example, Dartmoor. They ate cattle, sheep, pigs and deer as well as shellfish and birds. They carried out salt manufacture. The wetlands were a source of wildfowl and reeds. There was ritual deposition of offerings in the wetlands and in holes in the ground.

There has been debate amongst archaeologists as to whether the "Beaker people" were a race of people who migrated to Britain en masse from the continent, or whether a Beaker cultural "package" of goods and behaviour (which eventually spread across most of Western Europe) diffused to Britain's existing inhabitants through trade across tribal boundaries. A 2017 study suggests a major genetic shift in late Neolithic/early Bronze Age Britain, so that more than 90% of Britain's Neolithic gene pool was replaced with the coming of a people genetically related to the Beaker people of the lower-Rhine area.

There is evidence of a relatively large scale disruption of cultural patterns (see Late Bronze Age collapse) which some scholars think may indicate an invasion (or at least a migration) into Southern Great Britain c. the 12th century BC. This disruption was felt far beyond Britain, even beyond Europe, as most of the great Near Eastern empires collapsed (or experienced severe difficulties) and the Sea Peoples harried the entire Mediterranean basin around this time. Some scholars consider that the Celtic languages arrived in Britain at this time, but other elements of the Celtic cultural package derive from the Hallstatt culture.

In an archaeogenetics study, Patterson et al. (2021) uncovered a migration into southern Britain during the 500-year period 1,300–800 BC. The newcomers were genetically most similar to ancient individuals from Gaul, and had higher levels of EEF ancestry. During 1,000–875 BC, their genetic marker swiftly spread through southern Britain, making up around half the ancestry of subsequent Iron Age people in this area, but not in northern Britain. The "evidence suggests that, rather than a violent invasion or a single migratory event, the genetic structure of the population changed through sustained contacts between Britain and mainland Europe over several centuries, such as the movement of traders, intermarriage, and small scale movements of family groups". The authors describe this as a "plausible vector for the spread of early Celtic languages into Britain". There was much less migration into Britain during the Iron Age, so it is likely that Celtic reached Britain before then. The study also found that lactose tolerance rose swiftly in early Iron Age Britain, a thousand years before it became widespread in mainland Europe; suggesting milk became a very important foodstuff in Britain at this time.

Iron Age

(around 750 BC – 43 AD)

In around 750 BC iron working techniques reached Britain from southern Europe. Iron was stronger and more plentiful than bronze, and its introduction marks the beginning of the Iron Age. Iron working revolutionised many aspects of life, most importantly agriculture. Iron tipped ploughs could turn soil more quickly and deeply than older wooden or bronze ones, and iron axes could clear forest land more efficiently for agriculture. There was a landscape of arable, pasture and managed woodland. There were many enclosed settlements and land ownership was important.

It is generally thought that by 500 BC most people inhabiting the British Isles were speaking Common Brythonic, on the limited evidence of place-names recorded by Pytheas of Massalia and transmitted to us second-hand, largely through Strabo. Certainly by the Roman period there is substantial place and personal name evidence which suggests that this was so; Tacitus also states in his Agricola that the British language differed little from that of the Gauls. Among these people were skilled craftsmen who had begun producing intricately patterned gold jewellery, in addition to tools and weapons of both bronze and iron. It is disputed whether Iron Age Britons were "Celts", with some academics such as John Collis and Simon James actively opposing the idea of 'Celtic Britain', since the term was only applied at this time to a tribe in Gaul. However, place names and tribal names from the later part of the period suggest that a Celtic language was spoken.

The traveller Pytheas, whose own works are lost, was quoted by later classical authors as calling the people "Pretanoi", which is cognate with "Britanni" and is apparently Celtic in origin. The term "Celtic" continues to be used by linguists to describe the family that includes many of the ancient languages of Western Europe and modern British languages such as Welsh without controversy. The dispute essentially revolves around how the word "Celtic" is defined; it is clear from the archaeological and historical record that Iron Age Britain did have much in common with Iron Age Gaul, but there were also many differences. Many leading academics, such as Barry Cunliffe, still use the term to refer to the pre-Roman inhabitants of Britain for want of a better label.

Iron Age Britons lived in organised tribal groups, ruled by a chieftain. As people became more numerous, wars broke out between opposing tribes. This was traditionally interpreted as the reason for the building of hill forts, although the siting of some earthworks on the sides of hills undermined their defensive value, hence "hill forts" may represent increasing communal areas or even 'elite areas'. However some hillside constructions may simply have been cow enclosures. Although the first had been built about 1500 BC, hillfort building peaked during the later Iron Age. There are around 3,300 structures that can be classed as hillforts or similar "defended enclosures" within Britain. By about 350 BC many hillforts went out of use and the remaining ones were reinforced. Pytheas was quoted as writing that the Britons were renowned wheat farmers. Large farmsteads produced food in industrial quantities and Roman sources note that Britain exported hunting dogs, animal skins and slaves.

Late pre-Roman Iron Age (LPRIA)
The last centuries before the Roman invasion saw an influx of Celtic speaking refugees from Gaul (approximately modern day France and Belgium) known as the Belgae, who were displaced as the Roman Empire expanded around 50 BC. They settled along most of the coastline of southern Britain between about 200 BC and AD 43, although it is hard to estimate what proportion of the population there they formed. A Gaulish tribe known as the Parisi, who had cultural links to the continent, appeared in northeast England.

From around 175 BC, the areas of Kent, Hertfordshire and Essex developed especially advanced pottery-making skills. The tribes of southeast England became partially Romanised and were responsible for creating the first settlements (oppida) large enough to be called towns.

The last centuries before the Roman invasion saw increasing sophistication in British life. About 100 BC, iron bars began to be used as currency, while internal trade and trade with continental Europe flourished, largely due to Britain's extensive mineral reserves. Coinage was developed, based on continental types but bearing the names of local chieftains. This was used in southeast England, but not in areas such as Dumnonia in the west.

As the Roman Empire expanded northwards, Rome began to take interest in Britain. This may have been caused by an influx of refugees from Roman occupied Europe, or Britain's large mineral reserves.  See Roman Britain for the history of this subsequent period.

Protohistory
The first significant written record of Britain and its inhabitants was made by the Greek navigator Pytheas, who explored the coastal region of Britain around 325 BC. However, there may be some additional information on Britain in the Ora Maritima, a text which is now lost but which is incorporated in the writing of the later author Avienius.  Julius Caesar also wrote of Britain in about 50 BC after his two military expeditions to the island in 55 and 54 BC. The failed invasion during 54 BC is thought to be an attempt to conquer at least the southeast of Britain.

After some further false starts, the Roman conquest of Britain in 43 AD led to most of the island falling under Roman rule, and began the period of Roman Britain.

See also

 Prehistoric Scotland
 Boxgrove
 Gough's Cave
 Genetic history of the British Isles
 Happisburgh footprints
 Kents Cavern
 List of prehistoric structures in Great Britain
 Pakefield
 Paviland
 Pontnewydd
 Swanscombe
 Arras Culture
 Wetwang Slack
 Danes Graves
 Arthur's Stone, Herefordshire

Notes

Sources

 Ball, Martin J. & James Fife (ed.). 1993. The Celtic Languages. London: Routledge. .
 British History Encyclopedia. 1999. Paragon House. .
 Collis, John. 2003. The Celts – Origins, Myths and Inventions. Tempus.

 James, Simon. 1999. The Atlantic Celts. British Museum Press.

Further reading

 Alonso, Santos, Carlos Flores, Vicente Cabrera, Antonio Alonso, Pablo Martín, Cristina Albarrán, Neskuts Izagirre, Concepción de la Rúa and Oscar García. 2005. The place of the Basques in the European Y-chromosome diversity landscape. European Journal of Human Genetics 13:1293–1302.
 Cunliffe, Barry 2001. Facing the Ocean: The Atlantic and Its Peoples, 8000 BC to AD 1500. Oxford University Press.
 Cunliffe, Barry. 2002. The Extraordinary Voyage of Pytheas the Greek. Penguin.
 Darvill, Timothy C. 1987. Prehistoric Britain. London: B.T. Batsford 
 Hawkes, Jaquetta and Christopher. 1943. Prehistoric Britain. Harmondsworth: Penguin.
 Miles, David. 2016. "The Tale of the Axe: How the Neolithic Revolution Transformed Britain". London. Thames & Hudson Ltd. 
 Oppenheimer, Stephen. 2006. The Origins of the British. London: Constable.
 Pryor, Francis. 1999. Farmers in Prehistoric Britain. Stroud, Gloucestershire and Charleston, SC: Tempus.  
 Pryor, Francis. 2003. Britain BC: Life in Britain and Ireland before the Romans. London, Harper-Collins. 
 Sykes, Brian. 2001. The Seven Daughters of Eve: The Science That Reveals Our Genetic Ancestry. Bantam, London. 
 Sykes, Brian. 2006. Saxons, Vikings, and Celts: The Genetic Roots of Britain and Ireland. New York, Norton & Co. (Published in the UK, also in 2006, as Blood of the Isles. London, Bantam Books.)
 Wainright, Richard. 1978. A Guide to Prehistoric Remains in Britain''. London: Constable.

External links
Ancient Human Occupation of Britain Project
Britain's human history revealed
Scottish Archaeological Research Framework (ScARF)
700,000-year-old remains in Norfolk
The Boxgrove project
Ancient Britons come mainly from Spain
An audio-visual presentation by Dr Mike Weale of UCL talking about genetic evidence for migration

 
Britain
Britain
Archaeology of the United Kingdom